Belarus is a landlocked country in Eastern Europe bordered by Russia to the northeast, Ukraine to the south, Poland to the west, and Lithuania and Latvia to the northwest. Its capital and most populous city is Minsk. Over 40% of its  is forested. Its strongest economic sectors are service industries and manufacturing. 

For further information on the types of business entities in this country and their abbreviations, see "Business entities in Belarus".

Notable firms 
This list includes notable companies with primary headquarters located in the country. The industry and sector follow the Industry Classification Benchmark taxonomy. Organizations which have ceased operations are included and noted as defunct.

See also 
 Economy of Belarus
 Beer in Belarus

References 

Belarus